The 2011–12 Old Dominion Monarchs basketball team represented Old Dominion University during the 2011–12 NCAA Division I men's basketball season. The Monarchs, led by 11th year head coach Blaine Taylor, played their home games at Ted Constant Convocation Center, with one home game during the CIT at Norfolk Scope Arena, and are members of the Colonial Athletic Association. They finished the season 22–14, 13–5 in CAA play to finish in fourth place. They lost in the semifinals of the CAA Basketball tournament to Drexel. They were invited the 2012 CollegeInsider.com Tournament where they defeated Coastal Carolina in the first round and USC Upstate in the second round before falling in the quarterfinals to Mercer.

Roster

Schedule

|-
!colspan=9| Exhibition

|-
!colspan=9| Regular season

|-
!colspan=9| 2012 CAA men's basketball tournament

|-
!colspan=9| 2012 CIT

References

Old Dominion Monarchs men's basketball seasons
Old Dominion
Old Dominion
Old Dominion
Old Dominion